Acrocercops heteroloba is a moth of the family Gracillariidae. It is known from Ethiopia.

References

Endemic fauna of Ethiopia
heteroloba
Moths of Africa
Moths described in 1923
Insects of Ethiopia